The German School Moscow "Friedrich-Joseph Haass" is a German-language private school in Troparyovo-Nikulino District, Western Administrative Okrug, Moscow, Russia. The German Foreign Office and the Central Agency for German Schools Abroad support the school.

Notable alumni
 Mariya and Yekaterina Putina (daughters of Vladimir Putin and Lyudmila Putina)
 Princess Maria Galitzine, Russian-Austrian aristocrat

See also

 Germany-Russia relations
 Russian Embassy School in Berlin
 Russian Consulate School in Bonn
 History of Germans in Russia, Ukraine and the Soviet Union

References

External links
 German School in Moscow 

German diaspora in Europe
German international schools in Russia
International schools in Moscow
Schools in the Soviet Union
Germany–Soviet Union relations
Educational institutions established in 1956
1956 establishments in Russia